Sir Philip John William Miles, 2nd Baronet (2 September 1825 – 5 June 1888) was an English politician. Educated at Eton College and Trinity College, Cambridge, he then served in the 17th Lancers. He was a sheriff of Bristol in 1853 and partner in the family's bank, Miles & Co, from 1852 to 1854. He sat as Conservative Member of Parliament (MP) for East Somerset from 1878 to 1885 and was a member of the Carlton Club and the Army and Navy Club.

In 1878, he inherited the baronetcy of Leigh Court, Somerset, from his father William, who had previously been Conservative MP for East Somerset along, with estates in Somerset. He had his own estate in County Kerry, Ireland. He was cousin of Philip Napier Miles, Frank Miles and Katharine Tennant.

He supported an amendment to the Representation of the People Act 1884 and the Franchise Bill debated earlier that year, that would have allowed votes for women who were householders on equal terms with men. The vote was defeated and women finally received the vote in the UK in 1918.

In 1848, he married Frances Roche (1827–1908), daughter of Sir David Roche, Bt, Roche baronets, MP for Limerick. Frances was a renowned society beauty nicknamed the "Venus of Miles" in reference to the classical sculpture the Venus de Milo. She attracted a number of admirers including Charles Manners, 6th Duke of Rutland who scandalised society by leaving his 120-foot yacht, Lufra, to her in his will. They had the following children:

 Alice Catherine Miles (1850–1926), who married firstly in 1870 George Duppa, JP (1819–1888), and secondly in 1889 Lt Col Gerard Vivian Ames, 1st The Royal Dragoons (1853–1899), having six children between the two marriages.
 William John Miles (1852–1859).
 Edith Clara Miles (1854–1934), who in 1875 married Charles William Mansel Lewis (1849–1931) of Stradey Castle, Llanelli, Deputy Lieutenant and High Sheriff of Carmarthen, and had a son and a daughter.
 Mabel Constance Miles (1856–1944), who married Casamajor William Gaussen (chief guest at the wedding was the Prince of Wales, later King Edward VII, a friend and shooting companion of Sir Philip Miles), and had issue.
 Violet Bessie Miles (1867–1883).
 Sir Cecil Miles, 3rd Baronet (1873–1898), who married Minnie Spire in 1896 but had no children. His widow subsequently married Frederick Hilton Gibbes in 1904.

He died of acute laryngitis at his London house, 75 Cornwall Gardens, Kensington, SW, and was succeeded by his son, Cecil, in 1888.  His widow subsequently married an American from St Louis, Missouri, Dr John Nicholls, in 1904 and they lived at Maidenhead, Berkshire, and she died in 1908.

References

External links

 ThePeerage.com
 The diary of Alice Miles was discovered in the 1980s amongst Duppa family papers and published in 1993 in edited form and with commentary, as "Every Girl's Duty: The Diary of a Victorian Debutante".
 The Times, report of Parliamentary debate, 12 June 1884.
 The Times, obituary notice 7 June 1888.

1825 births
1888 deaths
Alumni of Trinity College, Cambridge
Conservative Party (UK) MPs for English constituencies
Politicians from Somerset
Miles, Sir Philip, 2nd baronet
UK MPs 1874–1880
UK MPs 1880–1885
High Sheriffs of Bristol
English landowners
17th Lancers officers
People educated at Eton College
19th-century British businesspeople